Darnell-Cookman Middle/High School of the Medical Arts, is a school within the Duval County Public Schools system in Jacksonville, Florida, USA. It is a National Blue Ribbon School as recognized by the US Department of Education. It is also an "A" school in the State of Florida school grading system. The school is located across 8th Street from the University of Florida/Shands Hospital. Darnell-Cookman Middle/High School of the Medical Arts is a dedicated magnet school. It serves students in grades 6 through 12. The first graduating class received its diplomas in the spring of 2012. Admission to the school is through a magnet lottery system administered by the Duval County Public Schools.

History

The Reverend S.B. Darnell was a Methodist minister who moved to Jacksonville to serve as pastor of Ebenezer Methodist-Episcopal Church. In the late 1800s, he founded the Cookman Institute which was located at Beaver and Hogan Streets. It was the first institution of higher education for African-Americans in the state of Florida specializing in the religious and academic preparation of teachers. Under the leadership of Reverend Darnell, the school served thousands of young black men and women until it was destroyed in the Great Jacksonville Fire of 1901.  The school relocated when rebuilt in order to move from the center of town. The Reverend Alfred Cookman, a friend of Reverend Darnell's, helped raise money to rebuild the school.  After rebuilding, the enrollment was about two hundred and fifty. The Cookman Institute for Boys had classes in all the elementary grades and in the four high school grades. There were special courses in normal training, music, domestic science, public speaking, printing, business, and agriculture.  In 1923 the Cookman Institute merged with the Daytona Normal and Industrial Institute forming what would later become Bethune-Cookman College.  The Cookman Institute facility was later purchased by the Duval County School System.  Eartha White, a well known Jacksonville activist, suggested naming the Jacksonville school to honor both Reverend S. B. Darnell and Reverend Alfred Cookman. In the succeeding years, the school served as a neighborhood middle school, an alternative school, and as a school for young women.

Today the school has an enrollment of approximately 1,100 students in grades 6–12 with an instructional staff of over 65. The school's colors are navy blue and gold and the school mascot is a Viking. Darnell-Cookman Middle/High School is an "A" school in the State of Florida's school grading system and a National Blue Ribbon School as designated by the USDOE.

Academics 
 
The academic curriculum for Darnell-Cookman Middle/High School of the Medical Arts offers only advanced, gifted, honors, accelerated, and Advanced Placement courses. The middle grades (6-8) curriculum is an accelerated math and science program. Students in the middle grades may complete math through Geometry and Science through Biology; both are high school-level courses meeting the graduation requirement. All courses in the middle grades are either advanced, accelerated, or gifted. The upper grades (9-12) curriculum is an Advanced Placement Honors/Scholars program. Students take an intensive and rigorous course load each year with extra emphasis on the sciences, math, and humanities. They will take a minimum of 8 Advanced Placement (College Board) courses and may take up to 12.

External links 
Darnell-Cookman Middle/High School of the Medical Arts official website
  — Darnell-Cookman Middle/High School of the Medical Arts official website

Awards 
Darnell-Cookman Middle/High School of the Medical Arts was recently named one of "America's Most Challenging Schools" by the Washington Post.
Ranked 34th in the nation and third in Duval County. *  

High schools in Jacksonville, Florida
Duval County Public Schools
Public high schools in Florida
Public middle schools in Florida
Magnet schools in Florida